Israel Idonije  (born November 17, 1980) is a retired Nigerian-Canadian defensive end in the National Football League and actor. Idonije was signed as an undrafted free agent by the Cleveland Browns out of the University of Manitoba. A draft pick of the now defunct Ottawa Renegades of the Canadian Football League, for whom he never played a game, Idonije spent the start of the 2003 season on the Browns' practice squad prior to his release in September. He was subsequently signed to the Chicago Bears' practice squad for the final six weeks of the season.

He has also played for the Detroit Lions, Chicago Bears, and New York Giants.

Early years
Idonije was born in Lagos, Nigeria and immigrated with his family to Brandon, Manitoba, Canada, when he was four years old. He attended Vincent Massey High School in Brandon and, though he had never played football and was reluctant, coach Kevin Grindey convinced him to play when the school restarted its Canadian football program in 1997, when Idonije was a senior in high school. He went on to play CIS football for the Manitoba Bisons. During this time he worked as a daycare teacher in Winnipeg, Manitoba, played in the East-West Shrine Game, and was drafted 17th overall by the Ottawa Renegades in the 2003 CFL Draft. At Manitoba from 2000–02, Idonije recorded 16 sacks which stands fourth all-time in Bison history.  He helped lead the Bison to the 2001 Vanier Cup where Manitoba was defeated by the Saint Mary's Huskies.  In 2002, Idonije was named 2002 Manitoba Male Athlete of the Year. His goal, however, was to play in the National Football League.

Professional career

NFL combine 
Idonije was not invited to the NFL Combine, but appeared on his own to distribute tapes of his years at University of Manitoba. Nine NFL team scouts were originally scheduled to attend a subsequent workout in Manitoba, but only one team, (the Cleveland Browns) ended up attending due to the SARS outbreak concerns at the time.

Cleveland Browns 
As a rookie in 2003, Idonije was signed by the Browns as an undrafted free agent, and put on Cleveland's practice squad. He was waived by the Browns midway through the season.

Chicago Bears 
Idonije was obtained by the Chicago Bears as a practice squad player late in the 2003 season and made the final roster the following year. Idonije also played gunner on the punt coverage team.

In 2006, Idonije became a restricted free agent and the Buffalo Bills attempted to sign him, but the Bears retained him by matching their offer.  During the 2007 NFL Season, Idonije had three consecutive games with a blocked field goal or extra point.  In 2008, Idonije set career highs in sacks (3.5), tackles (22), and passes defenced (6).  In May 2009, signed a two-year, $7 million contract extension with the Bears.  On December 30, 2009 Idonije was placed on injured reserve due to a foot injury.

In 2010, week 5 at the Carolina Panthers, Idonije recorded 3 sacks.

In 2011, in week 15 against the Seattle Seahawks, Idonije scored his first NFL touchdown after a fumble recovery in the end zone after Tarvaris Jackson had the ball stripped by Julius Peppers.

With the drafting of Shea McClellin in 2012, Idonije was moved to defensive tackle. In the second game of the preseason against the Washington Redskins, Idonije recorded 2½ sacks on rookie and Heisman Trophy winner Robert Griffin III. Idonije would once again record 2½ sacks in week three against the St. Louis Rams. Idonije ended the season with 40 tackles, 7.5 sacks, and a forced fumble, and he was later named to the USA Today All-Joe Team.

Detroit Lions 
On June 25, 2013, Idonije signed a one-year contract with the Detroit Lions. Idonije recorded 11 tackles and half a sack during the  season.

Second stint with Bears 
On March 18, 2014, Idonije signed a one-year deal to return to the Bears.
The Bears released him on June 19, 2014.

New York Giants 
Idonije signed with the New York Giants on August 5, 2014. He was released on August 30, 2014.

Outside football

Athlitacomics 
Idonije revealed his new comic, The Protectors, at its soft launch during the New York Comic Con in October 2012. He came up with the idea at the Chicago Bears training camp in 2007. The Protectors, set in the future, is based around a group of super athletes who learn they are blessed with super powers that help protect humanity. Idonije brought on writer Ron Marz and artist Bart Sears to complete the project. Idonije will be publishing the comic through the publishing company he founded, Athleta Comics. Athleta Comics is part of Athleta Entertainment.

The Protectors issue #0 made its debut at C2E2 in Chicago, April 26–28, 2013. Issue #1 is scheduled to come out in September 2013.

Idonije also created Sports Heroes' showcasing athletes through comic artistry, and Athlitacomics became an NFLPA licensee.  Sports Heroes can be found on the first of its kind consumable NFLPI licensed product.

Idonije launched his DreamKidz Love book series to promote social and emotional awareness for children. His first book "I Love Me (Izzy Cover) was released on Amazon on January 24, 2017.

Prior to the 2018 NFL season, Idonije and Athlitacomics formed a partnership with the Bears to create a "Monsters of the Midway" comic universe to promote the Bears' 2018 schedule.

Ask The Doctor 
Idonije along with serial entrepreneur, Prakash Chand founded medical question and answer service Ask The Doctor A portal allowing anyone, anywhere immediate access to a doctor.

Idonije and Ask The Doctor recently announced a scholarship fund for students entering 1st year of an accredited American or Canadian college or university, or exceptional high school graduates or high school drop outs looking to start a digital health company.

iF Charities 
Idonije established iF Charities, formerly known as the Israel Idonije Foundation in 2007. It is a registered 501(c)3 non-profit organization. It serves communities in Chicago, Winnipeg and West Africa - all the places Idonije has called home. iF Charities offers several core programs, projects, and events.

Blessed Communion 
Idonije started Blessed Communion in 2009. Blessed Communion manufactures dual-chambered, pre-filled Communion cups for individuals, churches and other religious organizations.

The Bureau Chicago 
Idonije opened up an office, meeting and business event space in the South Loop.

Order of Manitoba 
Manitoba Lieutenant-Governor Philip S. Lee announced on May 12, 2014 that Idonije is to be inducted into the Order of Manitoba. The ceremony took place at the Manitoba Legislature in Winnipeg on May 21, 2014.

Chicago Red Stars 
On March 1, 2021, the Chicago Red Stars of the National Women's Soccer League announced that Idonije had joined the women's soccer team's ownership group.

References

External links 
Chicago Bears bio

1980 births
American football defensive ends
American football defensive tackles
Black Canadian players of American football
Canadian expatriate American football people in the United States
Canadian expatriate sportspeople in Germany
Canadian sportspeople of Nigerian descent
Chicago Bears players
Detroit Lions players
Living people
Manitoba Bisons football players
Members of the Order of Manitoba
Naturalized citizens of Canada
New York Giants players
Nigerian expatriates in Germany
Nigerian expatriates in the United States
Nigerian emigrants to Canada
Nigerian players of American football
Nigerian players of Canadian football
Sportspeople from Brandon, Manitoba
Sportspeople from Lagos
Ed Block Courage Award recipients
Chicago Red Stars owners